Charles Elliott Perry (1871–1937) was a New Zealand Anglican clergyman. He was born in Melbourne, Victoria, Australia in 1871. He served as vicar of the Church of St Michael and All Angels Anglican church, Christchurch, New Zealand from 1916 to 1936.

References

1871 births
1937 deaths
Religious leaders from Melbourne
New Zealand Anglican priests
Australian emigrants to New Zealand